Ó Faoláin, or O'Faolain, is an Irish surname coming from the Irish for "wolf", also anglicized as Phelan or Whelan. Notable people with this surname include:

Seán Ó Faoláin (1900–1991), influential figure in 20th-century Irish culture
Eugenius Ó Faoláin, Bishop of Kilmacduagh during 1409-1418
Julia O'Faolain (1932–2020), London-born Irish novelist and short story writer
Nuala O'Faolain (1940–2008), Irish journalist

References

Irish-language surnames